Bryan Conlon (14 January 1943 – 11 October 2000) was an English footballer who made more than 250 appearances in the Football League playing as a forward.

References

External links

1943 births
2000 deaths
English footballers
People from Shildon
Footballers from County Durham
Association football forwards
Newcastle United F.C. players
South Shields F.C. (1936) players
Darlington F.C. players
Millwall F.C. players
Norwich City F.C. players
Blackburn Rovers F.C. players
Crewe Alexandra F.C. players
Cambridge United F.C. players
Hartlepool United F.C. players
Shildon A.F.C. players
English Football League players